
Gmina Tarnów is a rural gmina (administrative district) in Tarnów County, Lesser Poland Voivodeship, in southern Poland. Its seat is the city of Tarnów, although the city is not part of the territory of the gmina.

Villages
Gmina Tarnów contains the villages and settlements of Biała, Błonie, Jodłówka-Wałki, Koszyce Małe, Koszyce Wielkie, Łękawka, Nowodworze, Poręba Radlna, Radlna, Tarnowiec, Wola Rzędzińska, Zawada, Zbylitowska Góra and Zgłobice.

Neighbouring gminas
Gmina Tarnów is bordered by the city of Tarnów and by the gminas of Czarna, Lisia Góra, Pleśna, Skrzyszów, Tuchów, Wierzchosławice, Wojnicz and Żabno.

References
Polish official population figures 2006

Tarnow
Tarnów County